Étienne Delessert (30 April 1735 - 18 June 1816) was a French banker, insurer and industrialist. His family was Calvinist and was exiled from France around 1685 after the Revocation of the Edict of Nantes. Several members of his family returned to France in 1735. He was born in Lyon. Aged 20 he was put in charge of the trading house which his father had set up in Lyon. He based himself in Paris from 1777 and died there.

Businesspeople from Lyon
French industrialists
French bankers
1735 births
1816 deaths